Phasael (died 40 BC; , Faṣā'ēl; Latin: Phasaelus; from , Phasaelos), was a prince from the Herodian Dynasty of Judea.

Origins and early career
Phasael was born in the Hasmonean Kingdom to an aristocratic family of Edomite descent. His father, Antipater the Idumaean, was the close advisor of the Hasmonean king Hyrcanus II, and his mother Cypros was a Nabatean princess. Phasael was the elder brother of Herod.

Both Phasael and Herod began their careers under their father, Antipater, who was appointed procurator of Judea for the Roman Republic by Julius Caesar. Antipater appointed Phasael to be governor of Jerusalem, and Herod governor of Galilee. When Phasael's brother Herod was summoned to be tried by the Sanhedrin he meant to come to Jerusalem with an army and make war, however Antipater and Phasael managed to convince him to be satisfied with making threats of force.

While Mark Antony was in Bithynia about 41 BC, accusations were brought before him against the two brothers, who were objects of hatred to many Jews, but the shrewd Herod succeeded in obtaining the dismissal of the charges. It was impossible, however, for the Sanhedrin to rest content with the administrations of Herod and Phasael; and charges were again brought against them before Antony at Antioch. Once more the accusations proved to be fruitless, for  even the weak Hyrcanus II pleaded for them.  This led Antony to appoint the pair tetrarchs.

Revolt of Antigonus and Phasael's downfall
Meanwhile, Antigonus the Hasmonean endeavored to seize the Jewish throne; and in Jerusalem there were frequent conflicts between his retainers and those of the two brothers, which were especially perilous on the Jewish Feast of Shavuot. Phasael defended the walls, and Herod the palace, thus routing their antagonists, whereupon Antigonus invoked the aid of the Parthian Empire. In spite of Herod's warning, Phasael allowed himself to be lured with Hyrcanus to the camp of the Parthian leader Barzapharnes under the pretext of peace talks. Both Hyrcanus and Phasael were imprisoned. They were then handed over to Antigonus, who caused Hyrcanus to be mutilated, a disgrace which Phasael escaped by dashing out his own brains, having the satisfaction of knowing before he died that his brother Herod had escaped from Jerusalem and was safe.

Legacy
Josephus speaks of Phasael as a brave and noble man. His son, who likewise bore the name Phasael, and seems to have been posthumous, married Herod's daughter Salampsio, by whom he had five children. The son of Herod by his concubine, Pallas, was called Phasael by Herod, who likewise honored his brother's memory by naming a city northeast of Jericho "Phasaelis," and a tower of his palace at Jerusalem "Phasaelus."

See also
Herodian dynasty
Herodian kingdom
List of Hasmonean and Herodian rulers

Notes

References
 
1st-century BC Herodian rulers
Herodian dynasty
Military personnel who committed suicide
Ancient people who committed suicide
40 BC deaths
Year of birth unknown
1st-century BCE Jews